Chimping is a colloquial term used in digital photography to describe the habit of checking every photo on the camera display (LCD) immediately after capture.

Some photographers use the term in a derogatory sense to describe the actions of amateur photographers, but the act of reviewing images on-camera is not necessarily frowned upon by professional or experienced photographers.

Origin of the term 
The term 'chimping' was first written about by Robert Deutsch, a USA Today staff photographer, in September 1999 when writing a story for  the SportsShooter email newsletter. He did not invent the term but heard it passed down by word of mouth.

The term derives from the habit of the photographer looking at the picture in the LCD, and saying "Ooh, ooh, ooh!" imitating the sound of a chimpanzee.

Views on chimping 
Stephen Johnson, in his book on digital photography, writes:

He further points out that using the LCD panel effectively means that a light meter can be left at home and if the shot isn't right, it can be tried again. Therefore, the idea that only "wannabe" photographers need to look at the LCD and check the exposure, image, or both may be unreasonable.

Regardless of how the activity is viewed, it is now common to see photographers at media or sports events, "chimping" their shots, checking to see if they got the image they desired.

References 

Technology neologisms
Digital photography
1990s neologisms